The Swedish Institute is a  government agency in Sweden with the responsibility to spread information about Sweden outside the country. It exists to promote Swedish interests, and to organise exchanges with other countries in different areas of public life, in particular in the spheres of culture, education, and research.

The main office of the Swedish Institute is in Södra Hammarbyhamnen in Stockholm.  There is also a branch abroad; the Swedish Cultural Centre in Paris.  The agency has approximately 140 members of staff and its board is appointed by the Government of Sweden.

In early 2007 the Swedish Institute stated it was planning to set up an "embassy", the "House of Sweden", in Second Life, an Internet-based virtual world. This virtual office is not intended to provide passports or visas, but serve as a point of information about Sweden.

Other Swedish embassies in foreign countries are under the direct authority and control of the Swedish Ministry of Foreign Affairs.

The Twitter account @sweden

The Swedish Institute is responsible for the Twitter account @Sweden where a new "curator" is selected to tweet every week.

In 2017, SI blocked 14,000 Twitter accounts from interacting with @Sweden. Among the blocked were journalists, authors, politicians, businessmen and ambassadors. When the block list was reported in the media, SI lifted the blocks and apologized.

When media, with support from the constitutional Principle of Public Access, asked to review the list of blocked accounts  the government agency deleted it.

See also
 Swedish Institute Alexandria
 Cultural Diplomacy
 Public diplomacy
 British Council
Alliance Française

References

External links
 

Government agencies of Sweden
Foreign relations of Sweden
Cultural promotion organizations
Swedish culture